Kristy Jackson is an American singer/songwriter, record label owner, and a member of the BMI millionaire's club.

Biography 
In 1992, she wrote Take It Back, which was recorded by Grammy winning country music artist Reba McEntire. It was the first single from her album, It's Your Call, and reached #5 on the Billboard Hot Country Singles & Tracks chart in February 1993.

Jackson has released five albums since 2000. Her music is also used in film and TV, notably by Disney, Endemol Productions and Universal Pictures.

In 2001, she released the song "Little Did She Know (She Kissed A Hero)", which became the #1 most requested song among New York radio stations and elsewhere after 9/11. It also raised over $30,000 for 9/11 charities. In 2001, Jackson founded Fever Pitch Music, based in Greensboro, NC.

In 2008, "Little Did She Know" was rereleased by Grammy winning artist Patti Page.{Best Country Songs CD, Curb Records}

In 2012, Kristy created Triad Musicians Matter, a 501c3 non-profit corporation created to provide Triad North Carolina musicians and their families financial support when facing hardship.

Discography 
"Blue Shades" (2000)
"Little Did She Know (She'd Kissed A Hero)" (2001)
"Body & Soul" (2002)
"Best Seat in the House" (2006)
"Skinny White Girls EP" (2010)

Other work

References

1955 births
Living people
American women singer-songwriters
Singer-songwriters from North Carolina
Singer-songwriters from New York (state)
21st-century American women
Singer-songwriters from West Virginia
Singer-songwriters from Connecticut